Hoops is the second studio album by Australian alternative rock group, The Rubens, which was released on 7 August 2015 and reached number 2 on the ARIA Albums Chart. It was produced by David Kahne and mixed by Michael Brauer, except for the title track, "Hoops", which was produced and mixed by Eric J.

At the J Awards of 2015, the album was nominated for Australian Album of the Year.

A deluxe edition was released in November 2016, including the Acoustic Hoops EP.

Reception
Jessica Thomas of Renowned for Sound gave the album 4.5 out of 5, saying; "A major theme for this record is negative feelings that are inspired by draining relationships and these songs give Hoops an edge, they're dealing with the nitty gritty in such an appealing way. Tracks like "Hoops", "Switchblade", "Bitter End", "Cut Me Loose", "Battles" and "Hold Me Back" all deal with some quite serious subjects, with all of them stemming back to being hurt by someone (or something) that you once loved." She added "Overall The Rubens Hoops is a finely crafted vessel that takes us on a journey through the often-dark tunnel of life and keeps you dancing the whole way until you reach the light."

Cara Oliveri of The Music gave the album 4 out of 5, saying; "After two years on the road, the [band] have bottled their boozy late nights and one-night stand tales into a soul-sodden rock album. Crammed with gritty guitars, foot-stomping rhythms and Sam Margin's signature bluesy vocals that ooze country town swag, The Rubens have pulled off an epic round two of rock'n'roll tunes." she concluded his review with "Full of rock belters and woozy nuggets, The Rubens' second album won't disappoint."

Jacob Robinson of Daily Review gave the album 2.5 out of 5, saying; "Album opener and lead single "Hallelujah" has a stomping beat and a shout-along chorus that  creates some dynamics. "Cut Me Loose" manages to mesh soulful organ with some crunchy guitars in a pleasing manner. The best of the bunch is the title track, which at attempts to challenge the group's song writing abilities and shows they can extend themselves. Other than that, it's a pretty same-same host of dull, mid-tempo rockers. They could probably get away with it if any of the songs had a really cracking hook to stick in your brain like "My Gun" or "Lay it Down" did on their first album — but it does not."

Track listing
All tracks written by Scott Baldwin, Elliott Margin, Izaac Margin, Sam Margin and William Zeglis.

Charts
Hoops debuted and peaked at number 2 in Australia behind Dr. Dre's Compton. It sold 4,759 copies its first week.

Year-end charts

Release history

References

2015 albums
The Rubens albums
Ivy League Records albums
Albums produced by David Kahne